Jaakko Suikkari (20 September 1925 – 28 December 2014) was a Finnish sprinter. He competed in the men's 400 metres at the 1952 Summer Olympics.

References

External links

1925 births
2014 deaths
Athletes (track and field) at the 1952 Summer Olympics
Finnish male sprinters
Olympic athletes of Finland